Maria-Eleni Kordali is a Greek boccia player with a Paralympic boccia classification of BC3. Her specific disability is cerebral palsy. She won the gold medal during the 2012 Summer Paralympics in BC3 mixed pairs along with Nikolaos Pananos and Grigorios Polychronidis.

References 

Living people
Boccia players at the 2012 Summer Paralympics
Paralympic gold medalists for Greece
Medalists at the 2012 Summer Paralympics
Paralympic boccia players of Greece
Paralympic medalists in boccia
Year of birth missing (living people)